Agathis microstachya, the bull kauri, is a species of conifer in the family Araucariaceae, endemic to Australia. It was described in 1918 by John Frederick Bailey and Cyril Tenison White. It is threatened by habitat loss.

Description
The trunk is unbuttressed, straight and with little taper. Distinctive features are coarse, flaky bark, medium-sized cones with 160-210 scales, and leaves with numerous longitudinal, parallel veins.

Distribution

Timber
The wood has an even texture, is easy to work and polishes well. The heartwood is cream to pale brown in colour. It is not durable in contact with the ground, but can be used for house framing and flooring.

References

Notes
 Boland, D.J.; Brooker, M.I.H.; Chippendale, G.M.; Hall, N.; Hyland, B.P.M.; Johnston, R.D.; Kleinig, D.A.; & Turner, J.D. (1984). Forest Trees of Australia. (4th edition). Thomas Nelson, Australia; and CSIRO: Melbourne. .
 Agathis microstachya at www.conifers.org https://web.archive.org/web/20080501225647/http://www.conifers.org/ar/ag/microstachya.html]

microstachya
Pinales of Australia
Plants described in 1918
Conservation dependent biota of Queensland
Conservation dependent flora of Australia
Nature Conservation Act rare biota
Rare flora of Australia
Flora of Queensland
Taxonomy articles created by Polbot
Taxobox binomials not recognized by IUCN